The 1977–78 season was the 76th in the history of the Western Football League.

The league champions for the fourth time in their history, and the fourth season in succession, were Falmouth Town. They became the first club to win the Western League four times in a row. The champions of Division One were Keynsham Town.

This season was the first in which goal difference decided places for teams which were level on points.

Final tables

Premier Division
The Premier Division remained at eighteen clubs after Taunton Town left to join the Southern League, and Westland-Yeovil were relegated to the First Division. Two clubs joined:

Saltash United, champions of the First Division.
Shepton Mallet Town, runners-up in the First Division.
Clevedon changed their name to Clevedon Town.

First Division
The First Division was increased from eighteen to nineteen clubs, after Saltash United and Shepton Mallet Town were promoted to the Premier Division. Three clubs joined:

Bristol Manor Farm, from the Somerset Senior League.
Odd Down
Westland-Yeovil, relegated from the Premier Division.

References

1977-78
5